The B-segment Modular Architecture (BMA) is a global compact unibody automobile platform developed by Geely Auto. Its name derived from the larger Compact Modular Architecture (CMA) platform. While the CMA platform was jointly developed by Geely and Volvo, the BMA platform is independently developed by Geely.

The use of BMA allows for higher economies of scale, as all vehicles based on BMA will have a high rate of commonality with shared parts and components reaching 70 percent, reducing costs and time needed for component testing. With the use of BMA, vehicle development time may be shortened from over 36 months on average to just 18 to 24 months.

The platform is claimed to be developed from 70 percent high-strength steel and 20 percent hot-formed steel, and was designed to exceed Europe standards of 5-star safety norms. The BMA is also compatible with L2 autonomous drive and L3 autonomous drive in the future.

Applications 

 Geely Binrui (A06) (2018–present)
 Geely Binyue/Coolray/Proton X50 (SX11) (2018–present)
 Geely Emgrand (SS11) (2021–present)
 Geely Icon (2020–present)
 Lynk & Co 06 (2020–present)

See also 

 Compact Modular Architecture platform
 Sustainable Experience Architecture platform

References

External links 

 Official press release

Geely Holding platforms